James Crawford may refer to:

Politics
 James Crawford (Australian politician) (1870–1916), barrister and member of the Queensland Legislative Assembly
 James Crawford (Canadian politician) (1816–1878), Canadian businessman and MP for Brockville, 1867–1872
 James Crawford (trade unionist) (1896–1982), Scottish trade unionist
 James J. Crawford (1871–?), New York state senator
 James Sharman Crawford (1812–1878), Member of Parliament for County Down, 1874–1878
 James W. Crawford Jr. (born 1937), Democratic member of the North Carolina General Assembly
 James Adair Crawford, civil servant of the British Empire

Sports
 James Crawford (Burnley footballer) (fl. 1902–1904), Scottish footballer, played for Burnley F.C.
 James Crawford (footballer, born 1877) (1877–?), Scottish footballer for Sunderland
 James Crawford (footballer, born 1904) (1904–1976), Scottish footballer, played for Queen's Park F.C., Scotland and Great Britain
 James Crawford (American football) (born 1994), American football player
 James Crawford (basketball) (born 1960), American basketball player in the National Basketball League of Australia
 James Crawford (alpine skier) (born 1997), Canadian alpine skier

Other
 James Crawford (lawyer) (1808–1863) was an Edinburgh lawyer and Deputy Assembly Clerk.
 James Crawford (playwright) (1908–1973), Australian playwright and journalist
 James Crawford (jurist) (1948–2021), Australian legal academic
 James Coutts Crawford (1760–1828), Royal Navy officer
 James Coutts Crawford (1817–1889), scientist, explorer, and New Zealand public servant
 James Chamberlain Crawford (1880–1950), American entomologist
 James Harvey Crawford (1845–1930), founder of Steamboat Springs, Colorado
 James "Sugar Boy" Crawford (1934–2012), American rhythm and blues singer

See also
Jim Crawford (disambiguation)